White and Unmarried is a lost 1921 American comedy silent film directed by Tom Forman and written by Will M. Ritchey and John D. Swain. The film stars Thomas Meighan, Jacqueline Logan, Grace Darmond, Walter Long, Lloyd Whitlock, Frederick Vroom, and Marian Skinner. The film was released on May 29, 1921, by Paramount Pictures.

Premise
When an underworld figure inherits a fortune, he goes straight and endeavors to become a respectable businessman. But on a trip to Paris, he encounters a few not-so-honest types who think he is ripe for picking.

Cast 
Thomas Meighan as Billy Kane
Jacqueline Logan as Andrée Duphot
Grace Darmond as Dorothea Welter
Walter Long as Chicoq
Lloyd Whitlock as Marechal
Frederick Vroom as Mr. Welter
Marian Skinner as Mrs. Welter
Georgie Stone as Victor
Jack Herbert as Jacques
Loretta Young as a child (uncredited)

References

External links 

 
 

1921 films
1920s English-language films
Silent American comedy films
1921 comedy films
Paramount Pictures films
Films directed by Tom Forman
American black-and-white films
American silent feature films
Lost American films
1920s American films